Neferkare Iymeru was the ancient Egyptian vizier under king Sobekhotep IV in the 13th Dynasty, in the Second Intermediate Period.

Biography 
Neferkare Iymeru was the son of the leader of the broad hall Iymeru. Neferkare Iymeru himself is known from several monuments, many of them found in Karnak. On a statue now in the Louvre (A 125), he reports the opening of a canal and the building of a temple for king Sobekhotep IV. Other objects belonging to him are a scribe statue, statues found at Elephantine and Kerma, and a stela found in Karnak. He appears in an inscription in the Wadi Hammamat. 

He bore many titles, attested in various surviving pieces of statuary and inscriptions. They are nobleman (jr.j-pꜥ.t), Governor (ḥꜣ.tj-ꜥ), (smr ꜥꜣ n mr.w.t), Overseer of the City (jm.j-rꜣ njw.t), Vizier (ṯꜣ.tj), Overseer of the Six Great Courts (jm.j-rꜣ ḥw.t-wr.t), Great overlord of the land to its limit (ḥr.j-tp n tꜣ r-ḏr⸗f), Master of secrets for the house of life (ḥr.j-sštꜣ n pr-ꜥnḫ), and sab official (sꜣb). Additionally, the title jm.j ḏsr.w ḥr stp-sꜣ has an unknown translation.

Family
Neferkare Iymeru was the son of Iymeru and Satamun. His father Iymeru held the titles Royal Sealer and Director of the Broad Court/Hall. His mother Satamun held the title King's Sister. Note that his mother did not hold the titles King's Mother or King's Daughter, and her title King's Sister implies that her non-royal brother became king. While the statue is dedicated by Sobekhotep IV, Satamun can have been a sister to a predecessor.

Theories about his double name
Neferkare Iymeru had a double name. Neferkare is the throne name of several Old Kingdom kings, the most famous being Pepy II. Perhaps Neferkare Iymeru was born in Memphis, where this king was still worshipped in the Middle Kingdom.

References

Bibliography 
 Wolfram Grajetzki (2009) Court Officials of the Egyptian Middle Kingdom, p. 38-39 
 Kim Ryholt (1997) The Political Situation in Egypt During the Second Intermediate Period, C. 1800-1550 B.C, p. 243

Ancient Egyptian viziers
Officials of the Thirteenth Dynasty of Egypt